Sabater is a surname of Catalan origin, deriving from sabater (shoemaker). Notable people with the surname include:

Alfredo Benjamin Sabater Caguioa (born 1959), Filipino lawyer, Associate Justice of the Supreme Court of the Philippines
Arnaldo Sabater or Arnaldo Bristol (born 1945), Puerto Rican hurdler
Carles Sabater (1962–1999), Catalan singer and actor
Damià Sabater (born 1996), known as Damià or Dami, Spanish footballer
Francisco Sabater Llopart (1915–1960), aka "El Quico", Spanish anarchist against the Spanish State of Francisco Franco
Jimmy Sabater (1936–2012), American musician of Puerto Rican ancestry
Jordi Sabater Pi (1922–2009), Spanish primatologist and worldwide specialist in ethology, the study of animal behavior
Julio Sabater (1926–2003), Puerto Rican hurdler who competed in the 1948 Summer Olympics
Leticia Sabater (born 1966), Spanish television presenter, actress and singer
Luis Marín Sabater (1906–1974), Spanish-Basque football player of the 1930s and 1940s
Pau Sabater (1884–1919), Spanish anarcho-syndicalist in the Confederación Nacional del Trabajo in Catalonia
Rafael Ginard i Sabater, alias Romà, skipper in Port d'Alcúdia (Mallorca) in the 19th century
Rosa Sabater (1929–1983), Spanish pianist

See also
Amanda Sabater, Venezuelan telenovela produced by Radio Caracas Televisión in 1989
Sabatier
Sabaté

Catalan-language surnames